The TV Typewriter is a video terminal that could display two pages of 16 lines of 32 upper case characters on a standard television set. The  design, by Don Lancaster, appeared on the cover of Radio-Electronics magazine in September 1973.

The magazine included a 6-page description of the design but readers could send off for a 16-page package of construction details. Radio-Electronics sold thousands of copies for $2.00 each. The TV Typewriter is considered a milestone in the home computer revolution along with the Mark-8 and Altair 8800 computers.

Sometimes the term was used generically for any interactive computer display on a screen; until CRT displays were developed, the  teleprinter was the standard output medium.

Don Lancaster's TVT I 

Don Lancaster was an engineer at Goodyear Aerospace designing a high resolution video display for the military. Don was also a prolific author of hobbyist projects for Popular Electronics and Radio-Electronics magazines. The video project gave Don the inspiration for his most influential project, a low cost video terminal known as the TV Typewriter.

Built in the era before widespread availability of low-cost microprocessors or solid-state computer memory, the system used small-scale integration TTL digital logic and shift register memory. Much of the circuitry was involved in timing the output of the analog generator with the memory, which had to be shifted bit-at-a-time to the output. On-screen text was generated by the Signetics 2513, one of the first character generator integrated circuits.

The article appeared in the September 1973 issue. In addition to the six-page article, they also offered to ship out a larger 16-page version with complete layout plans for a mail-in fee of $2. Given its limited functionality, they initially estimated that the magazine would sell about 20 copies of the plans for  each. Instead, they were flooded by requests and eventually sent out 10,000 copies. With professional terminals costing over  this  kit looked like a bargain.

In the November issue, the editors apologized for the delays in shipping the TV Typewriter booklets to the thousands of readers that ordered them. They also listed electronics parts sources for the difficult to find components. Don Lancaster also answered a series of reader questions and gave ideas for additional functions and uses for the TV Typewriter. The December issue had a page of corrections for the TV Typewriter booklet. Both of the notices were included in later printings of the booklet.

The compact design and complex circuitry made the TV Typewriter a challenging project for hobbyists. But many finished the project and some even connected it to their Intel 8008 based computers. The April 1975 issue of the Micro-8 Newsletter has 6 pages of user modifications and interface designs to connect the TV Typewriter to Mark-8 or SCELBI computers. The original TV Typewriter design did not include a serial interface, modem connection, or offline data storage on cassette tape. Don Lancaster wrote about these in the September 1975 issue of BYTE magazine and his TV Typewriter Cookbook. A serial interface board designed by Roger Smith was published in the February 1975 issue of Radio Electronics.

Keyboards 
 Today keyboards are readily available and inexpensive, and they have a standard interface. In 1973, new keyboards were only available to computer and terminal manufacturers. Surplus keyboards were available to hobbyists but they often produced codes other than ASCII, such as Baudot or EBCDIC. The TV Typewriter project and kit did not include a keyboard. The unit on the September cover shows a keyboard project Don Lancaster did in the February 1973 issue. This project involved hand crafting 55 key-switches including fabricating the springs for each key-switch. Most hobbyists chose to use a surplus keyboard and modified it to produce ASCII codes. Don Lancaster's prototype TV Typewriter which is now on display at the Computer History Museum has a surplus keyboard with an ASCII encoder circuit that was published in the February 1974 issue of Radio-Electronics. The plans for this encoder were also included in the TV Typewriter booklet

Popular Electronics (April 1974) featured a complete keyboard kit designed by Don Lancaster and available from Southwest Technical Products for $39.50. The first version used simple RTL ICs to decode the key matrix. The design was soon improved to use a full featured keyboard encoder IC.

SWTPC CT-1024 

The hobbyist had to acquire the rest of the components on their own.

The original TV Typewriter was difficult to assemble and some of the ICs were going out of production so Southwest Technical Products decided to redesign the kit. The replacement was featured in Radio Electronics as the TV Typewriter II. This time readers did not have to order a set of plans, since the complete design was published in 6 issues starting in February 1975.

Daniel Meyer of SWTPC enlisted Ed Colle, an engineer who had worked at Datapoint on terminal design, to design the new TV Typewriter. The SWTPC CT-1024 Terminal displayed 32 characters by 16 lines without scrolling. It used common TTL parts and 2102 static RAMs. The boards were laid out with very loose part spacing and wide traces to make it easy to assemble. A complete set of option boards was offered including a serial interface. The keyboard was based on Don Lancaster’s design. The rest of the terminal was done by Ed Colle.

The design was finished by late 1974 and the kits were ready for sale by December 1974. The first advertisement for the CT-1024 appeared in the January 1975 issue of Popular Electronics on the page facing the Altair 8800 computer article. The CT-1024 was very successful because a complete kit with options cost only . It was replaced in 1977 by the improved CT-64 that offered scrolling and 64 characters per line of upper and lower case.

TV Typewriter Cookbook 

By 1975, Don Lancaster had written over 100 articles in magazines such as Popular Electronics and Radio-Electronics. He had also written a digital design book titled the RTL Cookbook in 1968. Resistor–transistor logic (RTL) was an early IC technology that was replaced by TTL, so in 1974 he published the TTL Cookbook. This book was in print for 20 years and sold a million copies.

The original TV Typewriter was designed before low cost RAM was available and the design was soon obsolete. Don had made many design improvements and published them as the TV Typewriter Cookbook in 1976. Portions had been serialized in the first issues of Byte magazine. The book was a guide on how to design a video computer terminal, divided into the following chapters:
 "Some Basics"
 "Integrated Circuits for TVT Use"
 "Memory"
 "System Timing – Calculation and Circuits"
 "Cursor and Update Circuits"
 "Keyboards and Encoders"
 "Serial Interfaces"
 "Television Interfaces"
 "Hard Copy and Color Graphics"

This book guided many hobbyist and professionals in designing video displays for home computer systems. The cassette interface design from chapter 7 was the basis for the Kansas City standard. The circuits in this book did not rely on a microprocessor, just TTL. The TV Cheap Video Cookbook (1978) showed the TVT 6 5/8 that would work with a 6502 or 6800 microprocessor. The design was targeted at the KIM-1 Microcomputer.

The original TV Typewriter book cover shows an ASCII keyboard designed by Don Lancaster and sold by Southwest Technical Products. An early computer store chain, the Byte Shop, had the publisher add their logo to the covers and sold the TTL Cookbook and the TV Typewriter Cookbook in their stores. A later edition cover was designed for Radio Shack stores. The ninth printing of the first edition was in 1983.

See also 
 History of computing hardware (1960s–present)
 Personal computer

References

Bibliography 

 Magazine
 Radio-Electronics; September 1973.
 Books
 
 
 
 
 
 Construction articles for TVT I
 
 
 
 
 
 
  
 
 
 Construction articles for TVT II
 
 
 
  
 
 
 Construction articles for TVT-6
 
  Has video software written in 6502 assembly language for the KIM-1 microcomputer.
 
 TV Typewriter Cookbook serialized in BYTE magazine

External links 
 Don Lancaster's TV Typewriter
 Don Lancaster's autobiography

Early microcomputers
Character-oriented terminal